The Protocol on Explosive Remnants of War is an international treaty concluded in Geneva in 2003 that aims to limit the impact of cluster bombs and other unexploded devices on civilian populations after a conflict ends. It is the fifth Protocol to the Convention on Prohibitions or Restrictions on the Use of Certain Conventional Weapons.

The Protocol came into effect on 12 November 2006. As of October 2020, there are 96 state parties to the agreement.

External links
Full text of the treaty – International Committee of the Red Cross
List of state parties, un.org.
New law aims to end cluster bomb devastation – ABC News Online

Arms control treaties
Protocol on Explosive Remnants of War
Protocol on Explosive Remnants of War
Protocol on Explosive Remnants of War
United Nations treaties
Treaties of Albania
Treaties of Argentina
Treaties of Australia
Treaties of Austria
Treaties of Bahrain
Treaties of Bangladesh
Treaties of Belarus
Treaties of Belgium
Treaties of Bosnia and Herzegovina
Treaties of Brazil
Treaties of Bulgaria
Treaties of Burkina Faso
Treaties of Burundi
Treaties of Cameroon
Treaties of Canada
Treaties of Chile
Treaties of the People's Republic of China
Treaties of Costa Rica
Treaties of Croatia
Treaties of Cuba
Treaties of Cyprus
Treaties of the Czech Republic
Treaties of Denmark
Treaties of the Dominican Republic
Treaties of Ecuador
Treaties of El Salvador
Treaties of Estonia
Treaties of Finland
Treaties of France
Treaties of Gabon
Treaties of Georgia (country)
Treaties of Germany
Treaties of Greece
Treaties of Grenada
Treaties of Guatemala
Treaties of Guinea-Bissau
Treaties of the Holy See
Treaties of Honduras
Treaties of Hungary
Treaties of Iceland
Treaties of India
Treaties of Iraq
Treaties of Ireland
Treaties of Italy
Treaties of Ivory Coast
Treaties of Jamaica
Treaties of Kuwait
Treaties of Laos
Treaties of Latvia
Treaties of Lesotho
Treaties of Liberia
Treaties of Liechtenstein
Treaties of Lithuania
Treaties of Luxembourg
Treaties of Madagascar
Treaties of Mali
Treaties of Malta
Treaties of Mauritius
Treaties of Montenegro
Treaties of the Netherlands
Treaties of New Zealand
Treaties of Nicaragua
Treaties of Norway
Treaties of Pakistan
Treaties of Panama
Treaties of Peru
Treaties of Paraguay
Treaties of Poland
Treaties of Portugal
Treaties of Qatar
Treaties of South Korea
Treaties of Moldova
Treaties of Romania
Treaties of Russia
Treaties of Saudi Arabia
Treaties of Senegal
Treaties of Sierra Leone
Treaties of Slovakia
Treaties of Slovenia
Treaties of South Africa
Treaties of Spain
Treaties of Saint Vincent and the Grenadines
Treaties of Sweden
Treaties of Switzerland
Treaties of Tajikistan
Treaties of North Macedonia
Treaties of Tunisia
Treaties of Turkmenistan
Treaties of Ukraine
Treaties of the United Arab Emirates
Treaties of the United States
Treaties of Uruguay
Treaties of Zambia
Protocol on Explosive Remnants of War
Treaties extended to the Faroe Islands
Treaties extended to Greenland
Treaties extended to Hong Kong
Treaties extended to Macau
Treaties extended to Tokelau
Convention on Certain Conventional Weapons
Treaties extended to the Caribbean Netherlands